Jonas Brändle (born 6 May 2000) is a German footballer who plays as a left-back for FC 08 Villingen.

Career
In July 2018, Brändle signed a local player contract with 1. FC Heidenheim, lasting three years until 30 June 2021. He made his professional debut for Heidenheim in the 2. Bundesliga on 8 March 2019, coming on as a substitute in the 87th minute for Marc Schnatterer in the match against VfL Bochum, which finished as a 0–1 away loss. In August 2020, Brändle's contract with Heidenheim was extended until the summer of 2022 and joined Regionalliga Südwest side Sonnenhof Großaspach on a season-long loan.

References

External links
 Profile at DFB.de
 

2000 births
Living people
German footballers
Association football fullbacks
1. FC Heidenheim players
SG Sonnenhof Großaspach players
2. Bundesliga players